The Dayak roundleaf bat (Hipposideros dyacorum), also known as the least roundleaf bat, is a species of bat in the family Hipposideridae. It is endemic to Indonesia and Malaysia.

Taxonomy
The Dayak roundleaf bat was described as a new species in 1902 by British zoologist Oldfield Thomas. Thomas named it Hipposiderus dyacorum, misspelling the genus Hipposideros. The holotype had been collected by Charles Hose on Mount Mulu, Malaysia.

Description

References

Hipposideros
Mammals described in 1902
Taxonomy articles created by Polbot
Bats of Southeast Asia
Taxa named by Oldfield Thomas